Kakkaveri is a village panchayat in the Namakkal district of Tamil-Nadu state, India.

References

Villages in Namakkal district